Sandroyd School is an independent co-educational preparatory school for day and boarding pupils aged 2 to 13 in the south of Wiltshire, England. The school's main building is Rushmore House, a 19th-century country house which is surrounded by the Rushmore Estate, now playing fields, woods and parkland. Sandroyd School was originally established by Louis Herbert Wellesley Wesley as a small private coaching establishment for boys hoping to enter Eton College.

In the latest Independent Schools Inspectorate report carried out in 2014, Sandroyd School was judged as 'excellent' in all nine inspected categories.

Location 
The school is in the south of Berwick St John parish, near the village of Tollard Royal and the county border with Dorset.

History 
Sandroyd School was founded as a school for boys by L. H. Wellesley Wesley at his home, Sandroyd House in Cobham, Surrey in 1888. He was a great-grandson of Charles Wesley. From 1898 the school was governed by two men, until then assistant masters at Elstree School: Charles Plumpton Wilson (1859–1938) and William Meysey Hornby (1870–1955), who took over from Wesley that year, as Headmaster and Deputy Headmaster respectively. Wilson retired in 1920 and Hornby took his place, until his own retirement in 1931.

In 1939, in anticipation of the Second World War, the school moved to Rushmore House, home of the Pitt-Rivers family. The house lies in the centre of Cranborne Chase on the borders of Wiltshire and Dorset. A link between the two sites is that Sandroyd House was built in 1860 for the pre-Raphaelite painter John Roddam Spencer Stanhope by the architect Philip Webb (1831–1915), the friend of William Morris, and it was Webb who remodelled the interior of Rushmore for General Pitt Rivers twenty years later.

In the 1960s the school purchased the freehold of the school site. In 1995 the school started to accept day pupils, and in 2004 it became coeducational.

Nursery and pre-prep school 
Sandroyd School has a pre-prep and nursery school known as the Walled Garden, opened in 2004, for children aged two to seven. This was described as 'excellent' in an ISI inspection report of 2014.

List of headmasters 
1888–1898: L. H. Wellesley Wesley
1898–1920: C. P. Wilson
1920–1931: W. M. Hornby
1931–1955: H. ff. Ozanne
1955–1963: K. B. Buckland
1963–1981: D. C. Howes
1981–1982: T. R. Reynolds (acting)
1982–1994: D. J. Cann
1994–1995: T. R. Reynolds (acting)
1995–2003: M. J. Hatch
2003–2016: M. J. S. Harris
2016–: A. B. Speers

Old Sandroydians
See also People educated at Sandroyd School
Former pupils, known as Old Sandroydians, include: 
Sir Terence Rattigan, playwright
Peter Carington, 6th Baron Carrington, Foreign Secretary and Secretary-General of NATO
Sir Ranulph Fiennes, explorer
Sir Tim Sainsbury, industrialist
Michael Dummett
Antony Armstrong-Jones, 1st Earl of Snowdon
King Peter II of Yugoslavia
Prince Tomislav of Yugoslavia
Justin Packshaw, explorer

References

External links

Preparatory schools in Wiltshire
Educational institutions established in 1888
1888 establishments in England